This is a list of episodes of the 2010–2011 Kamen Rider Series Kamen Rider OOO. Each episode title consists of three objects featured in the episode.

Episodes


{| class="wikitable" width="98%"
|-style="border-bottom:8px solid #000000"
! width="4%" | # !! Title !! Writer !! Original airdate
|-|colspan="5" bgcolor="#e6e9ff"|

Medals, Underwear, and a Mysterious Arm 

|-|colspan="5" bgcolor="#e6e9ff"|

Desire, Ice Pops, and Presents

|-|colspan="5" bgcolor="#e6e9ff"|

A Cat, Evolution, and a Glutton

|-|colspan="5" bgcolor="#e6e9ff"|

Doubt, a Picture Message, and a Helping Hand

|-|colspan="5" bgcolor="#e6e9ff"|

A Game of Tag, a Nest, and a Rich Girl

|-|colspan="5" bgcolor="#e6e9ff"|

Fashion, a Contract, and the Strongest Combo

|-|colspan="5" bgcolor="#e6e9ff"|

A Lousy Husband, a Trap, and a Jackpot

|-|colspan="5" bgcolor="#e6e9ff"|

Sabotage, Having No Greed, and Taking a Break

|-|colspan="5" bgcolor="#e6e9ff"|

Drenched, the Past, and the Scorching Combo

|-|colspan="5" bgcolor="#e6e9ff"|

A Fist, an Experiment, and a Super Bike

|-|colspan="5" bgcolor="#e6e9ff"|

A Traveller, a Swallowtail, and a Celebrity

|-|colspan="5" bgcolor="#e6e9ff"|

An Eel, the World, and the Gravity Combo

|-|colspan="5" bgcolor="#e6e9ff"|

A Siamese Cat, Stress, and the Genius Surgeon

|-|colspan="5" bgcolor="#e6e9ff"|

Pride, Surgery, and a Secret

|-|colspan="5" bgcolor="#e6e9ff"|

The Medal Struggle, the Transport Truck, and the Container

|-|colspan="5" bgcolor="#e6e9ff"|

An End, the Greeed, and a New Rider

|-|colspan="5" bgcolor="#e6e9ff"|

The Kendo Girl, Oden, and the Splitting Yummy

|-|colspan="5" bgcolor="#e6e9ff"|

Destruction, Motives, and the Eel Whip

|-|colspan="5" bgcolor="#e6e9ff"|

The Red Medal, the Detective, and Betrayal

|-|colspan="5" bgcolor="#e6e9ff"|

A Decoy, the Qualifications, and the Blazing Combo

|-|colspan="5" bgcolor="#e6e9ff"|

The Grasshopper, the Father and Son, and the Ally of Justice

|-|colspan="5" bgcolor="#e6e9ff"|

Chocolate, Faith, and the Power of Justice

|-|colspan="5" bgcolor="#e6e9ff"|

Beauty, the Egg, and the Sleeping Desire

|-|colspan="5" bgcolor="#e6e9ff"|

Memories, Love, and the Ocean Combo

|-|colspan="5" bgcolor="#e6e9ff"|

The Boxer, the Left Hand, and the Bird Yummy

|-|colspan="5" bgcolor="#e6e9ff"|

Ankh, the Ring, and Putting it All On

|-|colspan="5" bgcolor="#e6e9ff"|

1000, a Movie, and the Combatman

|-|colspan="5" bgcolor="#e6e9ff"|

1000, the Kamen Riders, and the Birthday

|-|colspan="5" bgcolor="#e6e9ff"|

The Older Sister, the Doctor, and the Truth About Ankh

|-|colspan="5" bgcolor="#e6e9ff"|

The King, the Panda, and the Blazing Memory

|-|colspan="5" bgcolor="#e6e9ff"|

Returning the Favor, the Plan, and the Purple Medals

|-|colspan="5" bgcolor="#e6e9ff"|

A New Greeed, Desire, and the Invincible Combo 

|-|colspan="5" bgcolor="#e6e9ff"|

Friendship, Chaos, and the Belt Left Behind

|-|colspan="5" bgcolor="#e6e9ff"|

The Close Friend, the Use, and This Connection

|-|colspan="5" bgcolor="#e6e9ff"|

The Dream, the Brother, and Birth's Secret

|-|colspan="5" bgcolor="#e6e9ff"|

Broken Dreams, the Body, and the Greeed Resurrection

|-|colspan="5" bgcolor="#e6e9ff"|

Sleep, One Hundred Million, and the Birth Transfer

|-|colspan="5" bgcolor="#e6e9ff"|

The Circumstances, a Farewell, and the Tearful Birth

|-|colspan="5" bgcolor="#e6e9ff"|

The Nightmare, Security Cameras, and Ankh's Revenge

|-|colspan="5" bgcolor="#e6e9ff"|

Control, a Birthday Party, and the Disappearing Ankh

|-|colspan="5" bgcolor="#e6e9ff"|

Siblings, the Rescue, and Eiji Leaves

|-|colspan="5" bgcolor="#e6e9ff"|

Ice, Greeedification, and Broken Wings

|-|colspan="5" bgcolor="#e6e9ff"|

The Vulture, the Confrontation, and Ankh Returns

|-|colspan="5" bgcolor="#e6e9ff"|

Everyone Together, the Perfect Resurrection, and Your Greed

|-|colspan="5" bgcolor="#e6e9ff"|

The Surprise Attack, the Proto Birth, and the Desire of Love

|-|colspan="5" bgcolor="#e6e9ff"|

The Eiji Greeed, the Double Births, and Ankh's Desire

|-|colspan="5" bgcolor="#e6e9ff"|

The Red Crack, the Satisfaction, and Eiji's Vessel

|-|colspan="5" bgcolor="#e6e9ff"|

Tomorrow's Medals, Underwear, and Arms Held

|}

Notes

References

See also

OOO